The Platine Wars is a term used by Brazilian historiography to refer to a series of diplomatic and military conflicts along the 19th century between the Empire of Brazil and neighbouring countries in the Río de la Plata Basin. 

These conflicts began in 1816, due to the intention of Prince Regent John of annexing the Banda Oriental (modern-day Uruguay) and pushing the Brazilian border to the left bank of the River Plate estuary.

The most notable wars in this period include:

Luso-Brazilian conquest of the Banda Oriental - 1816–1820
Cisplatine War - 1825–1828
Uruguayan Civil War - 1839–1851
Platine War - 1851–1852
Uruguayan War - 1864–1865
Paraguayan War - 1864–1870

Empire of Brazil
 
Wars involving Uruguay
Wars involving Argentina